The 1647 Santiago earthquake struck Santiago, Chile on the night of 13 May (22:30 local time, 02:30 UTC on 14 May) and is said to have brought virtually every building in the city to the ground. The earthquake was felt throughout the so-called Captaincy General of Chile, an administrative territory of the Spanish Empire. The maximum felt intensity was XI (Extreme) on the Mercalli intensity scale and there were about a thousand casualties.

Tectonic setting
Chile lies along the destructive plate boundary between the Nazca Plate and the South American Plate.

Damage
The earthquake was the most damaging in the history of Santiago.
Damaged buildings included the Iglesia San Agustín (Saint Augustine Church). Inside the church, the Cristo de Mayo crucifix was undamaged except for its crown of thorns which had fallen to Christ's neck, despite the diameter of the crown being smaller than that of the head. The Bishop of Santiago, friar Gaspar de Villaroel, salvaged the image from the debris and dragged it from the church to the Plaza de Armas to display to the gathering survivors.

Characteristics
The cause of the earthquake is not known with certainty, although from contemporary reports, it appears unlikely to have been a megathrust event. It may have been either an extensional event within the Benioff zone, or a shallow focus intraplate event, possibly along the San Ramón Fault.

Aftermath

After the earthquake the Cristo de Mayo crucifix was kept in the home of the landowner Catalina de los Ríos y Lisperguer, better known as La Quintrala, until her death in 1665. Each year since 1647 on May 13, many townspeople gather to commemorate the earthquake.

Some days after the earthquakes the city was affected by heavy rains which made the problems of sanitation worse. Over the next few weeks an estimated 2,000 people died of "chabalongo", the name then used for typhus.

Due to the high level of damage caused by the earthquake the government considered moving the capital a few kilometers farther north (in the area that is currently known as Quillota). The decision was made, however, to reconstruct Santiago on the same site.

Gaspar de Villarroel, Bishop of Santiago, said that the earthquake should not be considered as divine punishment for the sins of the inhabitants, adding that "it will be a mortal sin to judge that their (the citizens') sins destroyed this city".

In literature
The earthquake was the subject of a novella, The Earthquake in Chile, by the German author Heinrich von Kleist, published in 1807.

See also
 List of earthquakes in Chile
 List of historical earthquakes

References

Megathrust earthquakes in Chile
17th century in the Captaincy General of Chile
Santiago earthquake
Santiago Earthquake, 1647